99 zápaliek is the third studio album by Modus, released on OPUS in 1981.

Track listing

Official releases
 1981: 99 zápaliek, LP, MC, OPUS, #9113 1215
 2000: 99 zápaliek: Komplet 4, (5 bonus tracks), CD, Sony Music Bonton, #45 5361

Credits and personnel

 Ján Lehotský – lead vocal, chorus, writer, keyboards
 Ján Hangoni – lead vocal, solo guitar, chorus
 Marika Gombitová – lead vocal, chorus
 Karol Morvay – lead vocal, drums
 Alexis Engonidis – bass, chorus
 Kamil Peteraj – lyrics
 Ján Lauko – producer
 Štefan Danko – responsible editor
 Ivan Kostroň – photography
 Jozef Hanák – sound director
 Boris Filan - lyrics (bonus tracks 11-15)

Accolades
99 zápaliek was ranked 37th in the list of the 100 Greatest Slovak Albums of All Time.

References

General

Specific

External links 
 

1981 albums
Modus (band) albums